In mathematical analysis an oscillatory integral is a type of distribution. Oscillatory integrals make rigorous many arguments that, on a naive level, appear to use divergent integrals. It is possible to represent approximate solution operators for many differential equations as oscillatory integrals.

Definition

An oscillatory integral  is written formally as

 

Such a function,  is usually called a phase function. In some contexts more general functions are considered and still referred to as phase functions.
Intuitively, these symbol classes generalize the notion of positively homogeneous functions of degree . As with the phase function , in some cases the function  is taken to be in more general, or just different, classes.

One possible way to do this is by setting

 

where the limit is taken in the sense of tempered distributions. Using integration by parts, it is possible to show that this limit is well defined, and that there exists a differential operator  such that the resulting distribution  acting on any  in the Schwartz space is given by

 

where this integral converges absolutely. This is the main purpose of the definition of the symbol classes.

Examples

Many familiar distributions can be written as oscillatory integrals.

The Fourier inversion theorem implies that the delta function,  is equal to

 

If we apply the first method of defining this oscillatory integral from above, as well as the Fourier transform of the Gaussian, we obtain a well known sequence of functions which approximate the delta function:

 

An operator  in this case is given for example by

 

Indeed, with this  we have

 

and this integral converges absolutely.

The Schwartz kernel of any differential operator can be written as an oscillatory integral. Indeed if

 

Relation to Lagrangian distributions

Any Lagrangian distribution can be represented locally by oscillatory integrals, see . Conversely, any oscillatory integral is a Lagrangian distribution. This gives a precise description of the types of distributions which may be represented as oscillatory integrals.

See also 

 Riemann–Lebesgue lemma
 van der Corput lemma

References

Mathematical analysis
Generalized functions
Functional analysis
Schwartz distributions